Themis is one of the twelve Titan children of Gaia and Uranus in Greek mythology.

Themis may also refer to:

Space
 24 Themis, an asteroid in the (main) asteroid belt
 THEMIS,  a solar telescope located at the Teide Observatory
 Themis (hypothetical moon), a spurious tenth moon of Saturn
 THEMIS, Time History of Events and Macroscale Interactions during Substorms a constellation of five NASA satellites launched in 2007
 Thermal Emission Imaging System (THEMIS), an instrument on the 2001 Mars Odyssey orbiter
 Europa Thermal Emission Imaging System (E-THEMIS), a version of the THEMIS camera flown on the Europa Clipper
 Themis programme, a European prototype of reusable launch system to fly around 2025

Other
 Protein THEMIS, a protein in humans, required for proper maturation of T cells
 Themis (alga), a genus of red algae in the family Bangiaceae
 Themis (solar power plant), a former solar power plant in Targassonne, France
 Themis, a local nymph of the Arcadia
 THeMIS, Tracked Hybrid Modular Infantry System, an unmanned ground vehicle built by Milrem Robotics
 The Themis Files, a book series by Sylvain Neuvel